Bad Bush is a 2009 Australian psychological thriller film. Starring Chris Sadrinna from television soap Home and Away and Jeremy Lindsay Taylor from Sea Patrol and featuring Viva Bianca from Spartacus: Blood and Sand in her debut feature film, the film is based on the real-life story centred on a young woman with her baby alone with a crazed man on a property.

The film was mostly made at Mangrove Mountain and Somersby on the Central Coast, New South Wales. Appropximately 100 students from The Entrance High School worked on the film behind the scenes. Bad Bush premièred at the Avoca Beach Picture Theatre on 7 May 2009.

Box office
Bad Bush grossed $8,961 at the box office in Australia.

References

External links
 

2009 films
Australian independent films
2000s English-language films
2000s Australian films